{{Infobox animanga/Print
| type            = manga
| author          = Koyubita Beru
| publisher       = Square Enix
| publisher_en    = 
| demographic     = Shōnen
| magazine        = Manga UP!
| first           = October 5, 2022
| last            = 
| volumes         = 1
| volume_list     = #Manga
}}

 is an original Japanese anime television series produced by Pine Jam and directed by Kazuhiro Yoneda. The series aired from October to December 2022 on TV Tokyo and other channels. A manga adaptation by Koyubita Beru began serialization in Square Enix's online manga magazine Manga UP! in the same month.

Characters

A laid back freshman attending Gatagata Girls' High School who ends up joining the DIY Club. She is very accident-prone and is known for having a perfect attendance record at the nurse's office. Her name in Japanese order is a homonym of the "yourself" in "Do It Yourself".
 / 

Serufu's childhood friend and neighbor who attends Yuyu Girls' Vocational High School for technology as a first-year student. She is nicknamed "Purin" by Serufu (and subsequently "Pudding" by Jobko) due to her habit of getting easily worked up and is often not honest about her feelings, particularly when it comes to Serufu. Her name in Japanese order is a pun on “3D Print” (Suride Purin).
 / 

A third year student at Gatagata and head of the DIY Club. She has a strong passion for DIY, although this has led to some weird rumors about her around the school. Her family runs the Waku Waku Wan Wan hardware store.
 / 

A shy first year student at Gatagata and Serufu's classmate, who also joins the DIY Club.
 / 

Miku's classmate at Yuyu who is very friendly and energetic. She grew up in Southeast Asia. Because she does not go to Gatagata, she cannot be an official member of the DIY Club and is instead an external member.
 / 

A 12-year-old child genius from America who ended up enrolling at Gatagata instead of Yuyu due to a kanji mixup and is staying at Miku's house. As she doesn't like her full name, she received the nickname "Jobko" from Serufu after she hears her say "Good job!". She uses her genius skills and state-of-the-art technology to assist with her DIY projects. She returns to America at the end of the series as her stay in Japan was intended to be temporary.

The school nurse at Gatagata and advisor for the DIY Club, who constantly tends to Serufu's injuries. It is revealed later in the series that she is also an alumna of the DIY Club.

Serufu's mother, who is just as laid back as her daughter.

Media
Manga
A manga adaptation illustrated by Koyubita Beru began serialization in Square Enix's online manga magazine Manga UP! on October 5, 2022. The first tankōbon'' volume was released on November 7, 2022.

Anime
The original anime television series by Pine Jam was announced on March 25, 2021. The series is directed by Kazuhiro Yoneda, written by Kazuyuki Fudeyasu, features character designs by Yūsuke Matsuo and music composed by Ryōhei Sataka. It aired from October 6 to December 22, 2022, on TV Tokyo, AT-X, BS11, and NST. Crunchyroll has licensed the series outside of Asia.

Reception

Notes

References

External links
   
 

Anime with original screenplays
Avex Group
Crunchyroll anime
DIY culture
Gangan Comics manga
Japanese webcomics
Pine Jam
Shōnen manga
Slice of life anime and manga
TV Tokyo original programming
Webcomics in print